Serge Raymond (born 1967 or 1968) is a Canadian retired Paralympic athlete. He competed at the 1988 and 1992 Paralympics. He is from Montreal, Quebec.

References

Living people
1960s births
Medalists at the 1988 Summer Paralympics
Paralympic gold medalists for Canada
Paralympic medalists in athletics (track and field)
Athletes (track and field) at the 1988 Summer Paralympics
Paralympic track and field athletes of Canada
Canadian male wheelchair racers